Nebria leonensis is a species of ground beetle in the Nebriinae subfamily that is endemic to Spain.

References

External links
Nebria leonensis at Carabidae of the World 

leonensis
Beetles described in 2000
Endemic fauna of Spain
Beetles of Europe